The Gideon Hawley House is a historic house along Massachusetts Route 28 near the Cotuit village of Barnstable, Massachusetts.

Description and history 
The Georgian style house was built c. 1758 by missionary Gideon Hawley, who ministered to the nearby Mashpee Wampanoags, and he lived there until his death in 1807. It is a -story wood-frame structure, four bays wide, with a side-gable roof, wood shingled exterior, and a slightly off-center chimney that is not original. The entrance, located in the second bay from the left, is flanked by pilasters and sheltered by an early-20th-century portico. A rear kitchen ell is probably a 19th-century addition. The house was moved back from its original site during a road widening project in 1920.

The house was listed on the National Register of Historic Places on March 13, 1987.

See also
National Register of Historic Places listings in Barnstable County, Massachusetts

References

Houses in Barnstable, Massachusetts
National Register of Historic Places in Barnstable, Massachusetts
Houses on the National Register of Historic Places in Barnstable County, Massachusetts
Georgian architecture in Massachusetts
Houses completed in 1758